Russell James Harvey (July 4, 1922 – July 20, 2019) usually known as James Harvey, was a United States representative from Michigan and an inactive Senior United States district judge of the United States District Court for the Eastern District of Michigan.

Education and career
Harvey was born in Iron Mountain; his mother and paternal grandparents were immigrants from England. He enrolled in the University of Michigan in 1940, but interrupted his studies in 1942 to serve in the United States Army Air Forces for three years. He earned a Juris Doctor from the University of Michigan Law School in 1948, was admitted to the bar, and commenced the practice of law in Saginaw, Michigan in 1949. He was assistant city attorney from 1949 to 1953, a city councilman and a member of the Saginaw County board of supervisors from 1955 to 1957. He was mayor of Saginaw from 1957 to 1959.

Congressional service
In 1960, with the help of campaign manager Emil Lockwood, Harvey was elected as a Republican from Michigan's 8th congressional district to the 87th United States Congress. He was subsequently re-elected to the six succeeding Congresses, serving from January 3, 1961 to January 31, 1974. He resigned on January 31, 1974.

Federal judicial service
Harvey was nominated by President Richard Nixon on December 5, 1973, to a seat on the United States District Court for the Eastern District of Michigan vacated by Judge Ralph M. Freeman. He was confirmed by the United States Senate on December 13, 1973, and received his commission on December 19, 1973. He assumed senior status due to a certified disability on March 31, 1984. He took inactive senior status in 2002.

Harvey died in Naples, Florida on July 20, 2019, aged 97.

References

Sources
 
 
 
 

1922 births
2019 deaths
People from Iron Mountain, Michigan
Judges of the United States District Court for the Eastern District of Michigan
United States district court judges appointed by Richard Nixon
20th-century American judges
20th-century American politicians
American people of English descent
University of Michigan Law School alumni
County commissioners in Michigan
Mayors of Saginaw, Michigan
Michigan city council members
Military personnel from Michigan
United States Army Air Forces soldiers
United States Army personnel of World War II
Republican Party members of the United States House of Representatives from Michigan